Epinotia crenana is a moth belonging to the family Tortricidae. The species was first described by Jacob Hübner in 1814–1817.

References

Eucosmini